Dipterocarpus fagineus grows as a medium-sized tree up to  tall, with a trunk diameter of up to . Bark is greyish brown. The specific epithet fagineus is from the Latin meaning "like a beech". Habitat is mixed dipterocarp forest on hills. D. fagineus is found in Sumatra, Peninsular Malaysia and Borneo.

References

fagineus
Plants described in 1874
Critically endangered plants
Trees of Sumatra
Trees of Peninsular Malaysia
Trees of Borneo